Kaga Bandoro Airport  is an airstrip serving Kaga Bandoro, a town in the Nana-Grébizi prefecture of the Central African Republic. The runway is just south of the town.

See also

Transport in the Central African Republic
List of airports in the Central African Republic

References

External links 
OurAirports - Kaga Bandoro Airport
OpenStreetMap - Kaga Bandoro
FallingRain - Kaga Bandoro Airport

Airports in the Central African Republic
Buildings and structures in Nana-Grébizi